Green Valley is an unincorporated census-designated place located in the town of Green Valley, Shawano County, Wisconsin, United States. As of the 2010 census, its population was 133.

History
A post office was first established at Green Valley in 1907; the post office closed on May 21, 2011. The community was named from the green valley in which it located.

References

Census-designated places in Shawano County, Wisconsin
Census-designated places in Wisconsin